Megalopyge urens is a moth of the family Megalopygidae. It was described by Carlos Berg in 1882. It is found in Brazil.

References

Moths described in 1882
Megalopygidae